The 2020 United States House of Representatives elections in Nevada was held on November 3, 2020, to elect the four U.S. representatives from the state of Nevada, one from each of the state's four congressional districts. The elections coincided with the 2020 U.S. presidential election, as well as other elections to the House of Representatives, elections to the Nevada Senate and various state and local elections.

Overview

District 1

The 1st district encompasses the Las Vegas Strip, taking in Downtown Las Vegas, Winchester, Paradise, Spring Valley, and Whitney. The incumbent is Democrat Dina Titus, who was re-elected with 66.2% of the vote in 2018.

Democratic primary

Candidates

Declared
Allen Rheinhart, candidate for U.S. Senate in 2016
Dina Titus, incumbent U.S. Representative
Anthony Thomas Jr., security guard

Endorsements

Primary results

Republican primary

Candidates

Declared
Joyce Bentley, realtor and nominee for Nevada's 1st congressional district in 2018
Josh Elliott, publicist
Eddie Hamilton, businessman and perennial candidate
Citlaly Larios-Elias, fashion designer

Primary results

General election

Predictions

Results

District 2

The 2nd district covers much of northern Nevada, including Reno, Sparks and Carson City. The incumbent is Republican Mark Amodei, who was re-elected with 58.2% of the vote in 2018.

Republican primary

Candidates

Declared
Mark Amodei, incumbent U.S. Representative
Joel Beck, U.S. Air Force veteran and candidate for Nevada's 2nd congressional district in 2018
Jesse Douglas Hurley, entrepreneur

Declined
Heidi Gansert, state senator
Ben Kieckhefer, state senator
Adam Laxalt, former Nevada Attorney General and candidate for Governor of Nevada in 2018
James Settelmeyer, minority leader of the Nevada Senate
Danny Tarkanian, attorney, businessman and perennial candidate
Jim Wheeler, minority leader of the Nevada Assembly

Primary results

Democratic primary

Candidates

Declared
 Patricia Ackerman, candidate for Nevada State Assembly in 2018
 Ed Cohen, communications consultant
 Reynaldo Hernandez, produce clerk
 Clint Koble, nominee for Nevada's 2nd congressional district in 2018
 Ian Luetkehans
 Steve Schiffman, former U.S. diplomat
 Rick Shepherd, progressive activist

Endorsements

Primary results

General election

Predictions

Results

District 3

The 3rd district encompasses the southern Las Vegas suburbs including Enterprise, Boulder City, Henderson, and Summerlin South. The incumbent is Democrat Susie Lee, who was elected with 51.9% of the vote in 2018.

Democratic primary

Candidates

Declared
Susie Lee, incumbent U.S. Representative
Dennis Sullivan, physician
Tiffany Watson, caregiver

Withdrawn
Gary Crispin, marketing consultant

Endorsements

Primary results

Republican primary

Candidates

Declared
Brian Nadell, professional poker player
Cory Newberry, businessman
Mindy Robinson, actress
Dan Rodimer, former WWE professional wrestler and candidate for Nevada State Senate in 2018
Dan Schwartz, former Nevada State Treasurer and candidate for Governor of Nevada in 2018
Victor Willert, teacher<ref name= https://ballotpedia.org/Victor_Willert

Endorsements

Primary results

General election

Endorsements

Predictions

Results

District 4

The 4th district covers the northern Las Vegas suburbs, including North Las Vegas, and takes in rural central Nevada. The incumbent is Democrat Steven Horsford, who was elected with 51.9% of the vote in 2018.

Democratic primary

Candidates

Declared
George Brucato, small business owner
Chris Colley, re-recording mixer
Gabrielle D'Ayr, risk manager
Jennifer Eason, progressive activist
Steven Horsford, incumbent U.S. Representative
Gregory Kempton, teacher

Endorsements

Primary results

Republican primary

Candidates

Declared
Rosalie Bingham, businesswoman
Leo Blundo, Nye County commissioner
Jim Marchant, former state assemblyman
Charles Navarro, former district director for former U.S. Representative Cresent Hardy and U.S. Navy veteran
Sam Peters, U.S. Air Force veteran and businessman
Randi Reed, entrepreneur
Lisa Song Sutton, businesswoman, attorney, and former Miss Nevada United States
Rebecca Wood, businesswoman

Endorsements

Primary results

General election

Endorsements

Predictions

Results

See also
 2020 Nevada elections

Notes

Partisan clients

References

External links
 
 
  (state affiliate of the U.S. League of Women Voters)
 

Official campaign websites for 1st district candidates
 Kamau Bakari (IA) for Congress 
 Joyce Bentley (R) for Congress
 Dina Titus (D) for Congress
 Robert Van Strawder (L) for Congress

Official campaign websites for 2nd district candidates
 Patricia Ackerman (D) for Congress
 Mark Amodei (R) for Congress
 Janine Hansen (IA) for Congress 

Official campaign websites for 3rd district candidates
 Steve Brown (L) for Congress 
 Susie Lee (D) for Congress
 Daniel Rodimer (R) for Congress

Official campaign websites for 4th district candidates
 Jonathan Royce Esteban (L) for Congress
 Steven Horsford (D) for Congress
 Jim Marchant (R) for Congress

2020
Nevada
United States House of Representatives